David Nathaniel Kerzner (born July 10, 1968) is an American musician, songwriter, producer, and sound designer as well as founder of the sound sampling development company Sonic Reality Inc.  Along with Simon Collins, Kerzner is the co-founder of the band Sound of Contact. He is also the co-founder of the band Mantra Vega. His debut solo album, New World, was released in December 2014.

During his music career, Kerzner has worked with artists and bands such as Alan Parsons, Genesis, Francis Dunnery, Neil Peart, Keith Emerson, Tom Waits, and Smashing Pumpkins.

Early years

Dave Kerzner's interest in progressive music was born upon his exposure to early Genesis, as introduced to him by his good friend and band collaborator Jamie Rickel (drums). The early years were spent tirelessly working/developing original recordings, along with Dave Silverman (bass and vocals).

In the early 1990s, Kerzner began collecting rare musical instruments. When 16-bit stereo digital sampling technology became available, Kerzner sampled these instruments to license to such major digital musical instrument manufacturers as Alesis, Roland and Yamaha. Following this endeavor into the music software industry, Kerzner worked with such recording artists as Madonna, Ringo Starr, and Moog Cookbook as both a musician and as a sound engineer.

In 1994, Kerzner contributed to Kevin Gilbert's solo album, Thud and appeared as a band member on Gilbert's live album Live at the Troubadour. Kerzner joined the band Giraffe as keyboardist for a one-off tribute performance of Genesis' The Lamb Lies Down on Broadway album at Progfest '94 in Los Angeles.

Collaborations
In 2005 Kerzner performed with Jon Anderson of Yes along with Nick D'Virgilio, Stan Cotey, and Mark Hornsby under the band name Sonik Elementz for a one-off performance of "Long Distance Runaround" during the Winter NAMM convention in Anaheim, California.  Between 2007 and 2010, Kerzner collaborated musically with Simon Collins.

In 2010 Kerzner contributed sound design and assistance with music software for Steven Wilson's album Grace For Drowning.

Sonic Reality and Sonic Elements

In 1996 Kerzner founded the sound development company Sonic Reality Inc, which focuses on the sampling of every type of musical instrument from vintage keyboards to drums to orchestral and world instruments. While developing music technology and creative tools for musicians, Kerzner collaborated with professional artists to sample and digitally reproduce the sounds of many types of musical instruments. The sounds are played from music software such as samplers and other music recording tools. Sonic Reality also produces "play along" DrummerTracks and other backing tracks for guitarists, bass players, keyboardists, and singers to work with via various audio devices, mobile devices, and recording software. Kerzner's sounds have been used by artists worldwide.

In 2001 Kerzner teamed up with IK Multimedia to offer the sounds he created for keyboard workstations via computer software. Producing a majority of the sound range for the first comprehensive software rompler virtual instrument called "SampleTank", Kerzner developed a plug-in for popular recording software that offers every type of sampled music instrument with built-in effects to be played via MIDI.

While serving as CEO of Sonic Reality Inc, Kerzner has remained active as a musician as well as providing custom sound programming for touring and recording artists such as the Rolling Stones and Beyoncé.

In 2011, Kerzner founded Sonic Elements, a progressive rock project and electronic tribute band. Sonic Elements uses Sonic Reality samples to create unique virtual supergroups by combining different musicians with Sonic Reality-sampled drummers and other instrumentation.

In November 2014, Sonic Elements announced the development of a tribute album remake of Genesis' 1974 record, The Lamb Lies Down On Broadway, to commemorate the 40th anniversary of its release. The tribute album has been titled IT, and is scheduled for release in early 2015. The album is slated to feature several of Kerzner's collaborators including Francis Dunnery, Nick D'Virgilio, Steve Rothery and Billy Sherwood. The album also aims to combine vintage classic rock elements with an orchestra to produce a cinematic rock sound.

Sound of Contact

After Kerzner's initial 2006 meeting with Simon Collins in New York City, the two musicians co-produced a remake of the Genesis song "Keep It Dark". Kerzner collaborated with Collins and played keyboards on his album U-Catastrophe, appearing on the song "The Big Bang".

In 2010, Kerzner and Collins decided to form a band.  In 2012, they announced the band as Sound of Contact, with Collins on lead vocals and drums, Kerzner on keyboard, and colleagues Matt Dorsey and Kelly Nordstrom on bass and guitar. The band's debut album, Dimensionaut, was released worldwide in late May 2013.

On January 6, 2014, Kerzner left the band.  The official press release from Sound of Contact cited the loss of Kerzner as an "amicable split".  Kerzner stated he planned to pursue his own solo projects and continue his work with his company, Sonic Reality. In May 2014, Kerzner announced he and Mostly Autumn's Heather Findlay had co-founded a new band together, Mantra Vega.

Kerzner rejoined Sound of Contact in April 2015, and alongside Nordstrom, Collins, and Dorsey, began work in Oxfordshire on the band's second album.

Solo career
In December 2014, Kerzner released his first solo album, New World.  The album features numerous artists such as Fernando Perdomo, Nick D'Virgilio, Francis Dunnery, and Durga McBroom. Produced and mixed by Kerzner, New World was funded in part from a kickstarter campaign.

The album's vocals and keyboards were provided by Kerzner.  Using technology from Sonic Reality, mock-up tracks were created with Kerzner playing all of the instrumentation.  After tracks were re-recorded live by other musicians, Kerzner then mixed the results. Veteran recording engineer Tom Lord-Alge mixed the album's first single release, "Stranded".

Discography

Studio albums
 2014: New World
 2017: Static
 2022: The Traveler

Remix albums
 2016: New World - Instrumental

Live albums
 2016: New World Live

EP albums
 2016: Paranoia

Compilations
 2019: Breakdown: A Compilation 1995-2019

With Sonic Elements
 2012: XYZ—A Tribute to Rush
 2018: Yesterday and Today: A 50th Anniversary Tribute to Yes

With Sound of Contact
 2013: Dimensionaut

With In Continuum
 2019: Acceleration Theory Part One: AlienA
 2019: Crash Landing (EP)
 2019: Acceleration Theory Part Two: Annihilation

With Arc of Life
 2021: Arc of Life

With other artists
 1995: Kevin Gilbert, Thud
 2008: Simon Collins, U-Catastrophe
 2011: Steven Wilson, Grace For Drowning
 2012: Steve Hackett, Genesis Revisited II
 2020: The McBroom Sisters, Black Floyd

References

External links
 
 Sound of Contact official website
 Sonic Reality Corporate website
 Sonic Elements on SoundCloud

Living people
American rock singers
American record producers
American rock keyboardists
American male guitarists
American rock guitarists
American sound artists
1968 births